Jamie Jones (born 14 February 1988) is a Welsh professional snooker player from Neath. At age 14, he was the youngest ever player to make a maximum 147 break in competition, a record that has since been beaten by Judd Trump. At the 2012 World Snooker Championship, Jones reached his first ranking quarter-final. He made his second appearance in the quarter-finals of a Triple Crown tournament at the 2016 UK Championship.

Jones made his first official maximum break in the third frame of his last 64 match against Lee Walker at the 2018 Paul Hunter Classic. It was his first professional maximum break.

In October 2018, Jones was suspended from the snooker tour pending a match fixing investigation. 
The match in question was a 2016 International Championship qualifier between former world champion Graeme Dott and Jones’ good friend and compatriot David John.

In January 2019, Jones was acquitted of match-fixing following a hearing at which he was represented by sports barrister Craig Harris. However, he admitted to having prior knowledge of an approach to fix the aforementioned match and failed to report it, so was subsequently banned for a year himself.
Whilst his ban finished in October 2019, due to missing out most of the 2018–19 season, he ended the campaign outside of the top 64 and officially dropped off the tour.

Jones officially rejoined the tour two seasons later, coming through the second Q-School event of 2020, defeating Michael Georgiou. He had come close to regaining professional status in Event 1, only losing in the penultimate round to compatriot Lee Walker, who also went on to gain a tour card.

Career

Early career

In 2002, Jones became the youngest-ever player to make a 147 in an official event, making it aged 14, a record that has since been beaten by Judd Trump. Jones began his professional career by playing Challenge Tour in 2004, at the time the second-level professional tour. He qualified for the Main Tour for 2006/2007 by finishing top of the 2005/06 Welsh rankings, although he could not maintain his place there. His best result in his first season as a professional was to the last 48 of the Royal London Watches Grand Prix. After another spell on the tour in 2008–09, in which, despite some strong performances, he again fell away, he regained a place for the 2010–11 season.

2010/2011 season

Jones started the new season by winning three qualifying matches in the Shanghai Masters, beating Kuldesh Johal, Jimmy Michie and Adrian Gunnell before losing to Stephen Lee. After reaching the final of Players Tour Championship – Event 5, Jones rose to 47 in the rankings at the end of the season.

2011/2012 season
Jones made it to the quarter-finals of three Players Tour Championship events, but failed to progress further in any of them. However, his consistent performances meant he finished 23rd in the Order of Merit and therefore qualified for the 2012 PTC Finals, where he reached the last 16 of a ranking event for the first time by defeating reigning World Champion John Higgins 4 frames to 3, after being 1–3 down. This set up a match with Andrew Higginson, which he lost 3–4. Jones won two qualifying matches to reach the China Open, but lost 3–5 to Lu Ning in the wildcard round.

Jones finished the season by qualifying for the 2012 World Championship, beating Ricky Walden 10–2 in the final qualifying round. He then beat Shaun Murphy 10–8 in the first round, scoring two centuries. In the second round he beat Andrew Higginson 13–10, included a 135 break in the penultimate frame, to reach his first ever ranking event quarter-final. In the quarter final he was defeated 11–13 by former world number 2 Ali Carter, but made back-to-back clearances of 138 and 132 in frames 11 and 12, coming back from 12–8 to 12–11 before eventual runner-up Carter won the match. Jones made seven centuries during the tournament, with only eventual winner Ronnie O'Sullivan making more. Jones finished the season ranked a career high world number 29, meaning he had risen 18 places during the year.

2012/2013 season
Following his superb run in last season's World Championship, Jones endured a difficult 2012–13 season. He could only win three matches in ranking event qualifiers all year, with his sole appearance in the main draw coming at the Shanghai Masters. He beat Jimmy White in qualifying and Lu Ning in the wildcard round, but was then defeated 5–2 by John Higgins in the first round. He fared better in the Players Tour Championship events, with his best result coming at the Paul Hunter Classic, where he had wins over Jimmy Robertson, Jak Jones and Li Yan, before losing 4–2 to compatriot Ryan Day. He finished 67th on the PTC Order of Merit. Jones could not repeat last season's run to The Crucible as he was beaten 10–9 by Liam Highfield in the third round of World Championship Qualifying. His disappointing year was reflected in the rankings as he dropped 11 places to finish world number 40.

2013/2014 season
Jones reached the first round of the 2013 Wuxi Classic, but lost 5–4 to Liang Wenbo. He qualified for five more ranking events but was beaten in the opening round of each. He had a very good year in the eight minor-ranking European Tour events, losing in the last 16 in two of them. His deepest finish came at the Kay Suzanne Memorial Cup where he beat Ian Burns 4–2 in the quarter-finals. In the semis he was edged out 4–3 by Judd Trump and finished 15th on the Order of Merit to qualify for the Finals for the third time in four years. Jones lost 4–2 to Mark Allen in the first round. His drop down the rankings continued as he ended the season as the world number 55.

2014/2015 season
At the 2014 Wuxi Classic, Jones defeated Ken Doherty 5–2, before losing 5–3 to Marco Fu in the second round. He won three matches to qualify for the Australian Goldfields Open and thrashed Stephen Maguire 5–0, before being the victim of a whitewash in the second round by Neil Robertson. The next match Jones could win at the venue stage of a ranking event was at the Welsh Open, 4–0 over Chris Norbury. In the second round he knocked out Shaun Murphy 4–3 and stated that he plays his best snooker in the televised stages of tournaments. In an all-Welsh affair, Jones lost 4–2 to Mark Williams in the third round. He then reached the last 16 in back-to-back ranking tournaments, losing 4–1 to Thepchaiya Un-Nooh at the Indian Open and 5–3 to Murphy at the China Open. Jones qualified for his second World Championship by beating Adam Duffy 10–8 in the final round. He suffered a heavy 10–2 loss to Neil Robertson in the first round. However, Jones halted his slide down the rankings as he climbed 17 spots this season to end it 38th.

2015/2016 season
After edging Mark Davis 5–4 in the opening round of the Australian Goldfields Open, Jones thrashed Mark Selby 5–1 and said that he hoped running during the off-season would give himself a better chance of winning more matches this season. He played friend and former schoolmate Michael White in the quarter-finals with Jones recovering from 4–2 down to tie the match at 4–4. In the deciding frame White made a break of 56, before missing a red and Jones cleared with a 66 to reach the first ranking semi-final of his career. He raced into a 4–0 lead over John Higgins, but then lost six frames in a row to exit the tournament. Jones beat Ian Glover 6–4 and Xiao Guodong 6–1 at the UK Championship and made two centuries against Selby, but lost 6–5 with Selby stating that Jones had deserved to win the match. He played in three more ranking events, but lost in the first round of each and his season was ended with a 10–5 loss to Hamza Akbar in World Championship qualifying, who had previously lost all eight of his matches on tour.

2016/2017 season
Jones dropped just two frames in reaching the quarter-finals of the 2016 Paul Hunter Classic, but then lost 4–1 to Tom Ford. At the UK Championship he saw off Eden Sharav 6–1 in the first round and then had a trio of 6–2 victories over Alan McManus, Ding Junhui and David Gilbert to mean he had made two ranking event quarter-finals in the same season for the first time in his career. Jones had a great chance to reach his second semi-final as he led Marco Fu 5–2, but he would go on to lose 6–5.
Jones was 4–0 ahead of Graeme Dott in the final qualifying round for the World Championship, but was beaten 10–8.

Performance and rankings timeline

Career finals

Minor-ranking finals: 1

Pro-am finals: 4 (2 titles)

Amateur finals: 5 (5 titles)

References

External links

Jamie Jones at worldsnooker.com
 
 Profile on Global Snooker

Welsh snooker players
1988 births
Living people
Snooker players from Neath